Aliabad-e Hojjat (also Romanized as ‘Alīābād-e Ḩojjat; also known as ‘Alīābād and ‘Alīābād-e Moz̧affarī) is a village in Takab Rural District, Shahdad District, Kerman County, Kerman Province, Iran. At the 2006 census, its population was 114, in 24 families.

References 

Populated places in Kerman County